Carly Pearce is the second studio album by American country music artist Carly Pearce. The album was released on February 14, 2020.

Commercial performance
Carly Pearce debuted at No. 6 on Top Country Albums, with 4,900 copies sold the first week. As of March 2020, the album has sold 6,800 copies, and 83,000 in units consumed.

Singles
The album's lead single, "Closer to You" was released on November 2, 2018.

"I Hope You're Happy Now", a duet with fellow country singer Lee Brice, was released as Pearce's second single from the album on September 27, 2019.

Promotional singles
Four promotional singles were issued prior to the album's release. "It Won't Always Be Like This" was released on December 6, 2019 along with the announcement of her album title and tracklist, followed by "Call Me," "Heart's Going Out of Its Mind," and "You Kissed Me First" in January 2020.

Track listing

Personnel
Adapted from liner notes.

Lee Brice - duet vocals (track 3)
busbee - Hammond B-3 organ (track 2), programming (tracks 1, 2), background vocals (track 7)
Dave Cohen - keyboards (tracks 8-11)
Ian Fitchuk - Hammond B-3 organ (track 1), keyboards (tracks 3-7, 12, 13), piano (tracks 1, 2), synthesizer (track 6)
Jesse Frasure - programming (track 7)
Mark Hill - bass guitar (all tracks)
Trey Keller - background vocals (track 10)
Hillary Lindsey - background vocals (tracks 1, 13)
Josh Matheny - dobro (all tracks), steel guitar (tracks 1, 2, 4-6)
Jerry McPherson - electric guitar (tracks 8-11)
Carly Pearce - lead vocals (all tracks), background vocals (tracks 6, 7)
Michael Ray - duet vocals (track 7)
Jordan Reynolds - background vocals (tracks 2, 5, 8, 12)
Jerry Roe - drums (tracks 8-11)
Gordie Sampson - programming (tracks 1, 12)
Savana Santos - background vocals (track 9)
Aaron Sterling - drums (tracks 1-7, 12, 13), percussion (tracks 1, 2, 4-7)
Russell Terrell - background vocals (tracks 1, 12)
Ilya Toshinsky - acoustic guitar (all tracks), banjo (tracks 4, 6), mandolin (tracks 1, 2, 4, 7, 12)
Mark Trussell - electric guitar (tracks 2, 13)
Alison Veltz - background vocals (tracks 2, 4, 5)
Laura Veltz - background vocals (tracks 5, 6, 11)
Derek Wells - electric guitar (tracks 1-7, 12, 13)
Ben West - keyboards (track 13), programming (track 13), synthesizer (track 6)

Charts

Weekly charts

Year-end charts

See also
List of 2020 albums

References

2020 albums
Carly Pearce albums
Big Machine Records albums
Albums produced by busbee